Liam Coombes (born 1 May 1997) is an Irish rugby union player for Munster in the United Rugby Championship and European Rugby Champions Cup. He plays primarily as a wing, though has also played fullback and centre, and represents Garryowen in the All-Ireland League.

Early life
Born in Skibbereen, Cork, Coombes first began playing rugby for his local side Skibbereen RFC alongside his cousin, Gavin Coombes, before playing schools rugby for Christian Brothers College during his leaving cert cycle and winning the Munster Schools Rugby Senior Cup in March 2016 alongside Munster teammate Alex McHenry. Coombes went on to represent Munster at under-18 clubs, under-19, under-20/development and 'A' level.

Munster
Having previously been part the sub-academy, Coombes joined the Munster academy ahead of the 2017–18 season. He made his first non-competitive appearance for Munster in their 32–28 pre-season friendly victory against London Irish on 17 August 2018. Coombes made his full senior debut for Munster in their 2018–19 Pro14 fixture against South African side Cheetahs on 4 November 2018, having been drafted into the starting XV late on after Sammy Arnold failed to recover from concussion, and scored his first try for the province in their 30–26 away win. Coombes joined the Munster senior squad on a one-year contract ahead of the 2020–21 season and extended that deal by a further year in February 2021. He signed a two-year contract extension with Munster in January 2022.

Ireland
Coombes was called up to the Ireland Under-20 squad for the 2017 World Rugby Under 20 Championship after an injury suffered by fellow Munster colleague Colm Hogan, and he went on to start against New Zealand Under-20.

Honours

Christian Brothers College
Munster Schools Rugby Senior Cup:
Winner (1): 2016

References

External links
Munster Senior Profile
Munster Academy Profile
URC Profile

1997 births
Living people
People educated at Christian Brothers College, Cork
Rugby union players from County Cork
Irish rugby union players
Garryowen Football Club players
Munster Rugby players
Rugby union wings
Rugby union fullbacks
Rugby union centres